Unison is a studio album by musicians George Mraz and Zoe Rahman, released on 15 July 2013 by Cube-Metier.

Background
Music producer Paul Vlcek sought Zoe Rahman out to play with George Mraz from amongst the most talented British jazz pianists.

Critical response
Steve Arloff of MusicWeb International said of Unison, "...this superb disc of beautiful chamber jazz because it truly represents the meeting of minds of two superlative musicians who, would you believe, met for the first time only on the afternoon of this, the third in a series of concerts held for charity."

Track listing

Personnel
Musicians
Zoe Rahman – piano
George Mraz – bass

References

External links

2013 albums
Instrumental albums
Zoe Rahman albums
George Mraz albums